Junior Lotomau Sifa (born 24 March 1983) is a former American international rugby union player who previously played in Ireland for Midleton as a centre and for Nottingham Rugby. Sifa attended Edgewater College. He made the USA squad for the 2011 Rugby World Cup. After the World Cup Sifa retired from professional rugby and moved to Perth, Australia where he began playing for the Associates Rugby Club.

External links
Scrum.com

1983 births
Living people
Rugby union centres
American rugby union players
United States international rugby union players
Nottingham R.F.C. players
People from Faga'alu
American Samoan rugby union players